The Conference League Cup 2008–09, known as the Setanta Shield 2008–09 for sponsorship reasons, is the second season of the Conference League Cup competition after its resurrection by Conference sponsors Blue Square and competition sponsors Setanta. With the entrance of all Conference teams from every division, there will be 68 entries into the tournament. The total prize money is £200,000. Teams in the Conference's two regional divisions enter in the first round, are joined by the six lowest-ranked Conference National teams in the second with the competition completed by the final eighteen clubs for the third round. The tournament was abolished upon the completion of this edition.

Calendar

First round
The First Round was contested by all 44 teams from the Northern and Southern Divisions, which were divided into a Northern and Southern section. Matches were played in the week commencing 8 September 2008, with the exceptions of the Alfreton Town versus Stafford Rangers and Redditch United versus Solihull Moors games, which were played on 16 September and 23 September respectively, after both fixtures were postponed due to waterlogged pitches.

Northern Section

Southern Section

Second round
The Second Round was contested by the remaining 22 teams from the Northern and Southern Divisions and the six lowest-ranking teams from Conference National. It was divided into a Northern and Southern section. Matches will be played in the week commencing 6 October 2008.

Northern Section

Southern Section

Third round
The Third Round was contested by the remaining 14 teams from the previous fixtures with the addition of the 18 highest-ranked teams from the Conference National. Unlike previous rounds, the draw was not officially divided into a Northern and Southern section although some geographical grouping occurred in the draw. Matches will be played in the week commencing 3 November 2008.

Fourth round
The Fourth Round was contested by the remaining 16 teams from across the three divisions. Unlike the previous round the draw was officially divided into a Northern and Southern section. Matches will be played in the week commencing 2 December 2008.

Northern Section

Southern Section

Quarter-finals
The draw for the quarter-finals was held on 9 December 2008. Ties were to be played w/c 12 January 2009 but due to postponements two games were played in January, February and March 2009

Northern Section

Southern Section

Semi-finals
Due to the weather disrupted winter, the semi-finals were delayed and eventually played on 26 March 2009.

Northern Section

Southern Section

Final
The 2009 Conference League Cup Final took place on 9 April 2009 and was contested by Forest Green Rovers and AFC Telford United at The New Lawn, the home of Forest Green. Rovers had the best of the game but they lacked a cutting edge to see off Telford and ultimately they went on to lose in a penalty shoot-out. Telford goalkeeper Ryan Young saved penalties from Andy Mangan, Conal Platt, and Paul Lloyd, whilst Jon Adams, Mark Danks, and Gavin Cowan were all successful from the spot for United.

References

Conference League Cup
Cup